Zsolt Balázs (born 11 August 1988) is a Hungarian striker who plays for Budaörs.

Early life
His maternal grandfather was László Aradszky singer.

Career statistics

.

External links 
 Player info
 HLSZ 
 kesport 
 

1988 births
Living people
People from Zalaegerszeg
Hungarian footballers
Association football forwards
Zalaegerszegi TE players
Kecskeméti TE players
Paksi FC players
Budapest Honvéd FC players
BFC Siófok players
NK Nafta Lendava players
Kaposvári Rákóczi FC players
Budaörsi SC footballers
Nemzeti Bajnokság I players
Nemzeti Bajnokság II players
Slovenian Second League players
Hungarian expatriate footballers
Expatriate footballers in Slovenia
Hungarian expatriate sportspeople in Slovenia
Sportspeople from Zala County